"Portland" is a song recorded by Canadian rapper Drake from his album, More Life. It features vocals from American rappers Quavo and Travis Scott. The song  was sent to rhythmic crossover radio May 16, 2017, as the fourth single from the playlist. The song also appears in the video game NBA 2K18.

Commercial performance

North America
On April 8, 2017, "Portland" entered the charts at number 6 and spent 18 weeks on the Billboard Canadian Hot 100. The song spent 16 weeks on the US Billboard Hot 100, entering the charts at number 9, its immediate peak, on April 8, 2017, As for the featured acts on "Portland," Quavo earns his first Hot 100 top 10 as a soloist (in addition to his first top 10 as a member of Migos, "Bad and Boujee"), while Travis Scott also achieves his first top 10 on the tally.

Internationally
The song has peaked in the top 40 in Ireland, New Zealand, Switzerland, the United Kingdom and has charted on the charts of Austria, France, Germany, the Netherlands, Portugal, Slovakia, and Sweden.

Charts

Weekly charts

Year-end charts

Certifications

Release history

References

2017 songs
Drake (musician) songs
Quavo songs
Songs written by Drake (musician)
Song recordings produced by Murda Beatz
Songs written by Murda Beatz
Songs written by Travis Scott
Songs written by Quavo
Songs written by Tim Gomringer
Songs written by Kevin Gomringer